Matthew Russell (born 6 June 1993) is a Scottish professional rugby league footballer who plays as a  or er for the Warrington Wolves in the Betfred Super League and Scotland at international level.

He previously played for the Wigan Warriors in the Super League, and on loan from Wigan at Hull F.C. in the top flight. Russell spent a season with the Gold Coast Titans in the NRL. He later played for the Warrington Wolves in the Super League, and spent time on loan from Warrington at the Swinton Lions in the Championship. Russell also played for the Toronto Wolfpack in the Betfred Championship and the top flight.

Background
Russell was born in Irvine, North Ayrshire, Scotland.

Career
Russell's Super League career started with Wigan, playing some games on loan to Hull FC.

He then agreed a two-year deal with Australian NRL team, the Gold Coast Titans, but returned to England a season later.

On 16 April 2014, the entertaining, fast running Scottish fullback, signed a new three-year deal that would keep him at Warrington until November 2017.

He played in the 2016 Challenge Cup Final defeat by Hull F.C. at Wembley Stadium.

He played in the 2016 Super League Grand Final defeat by Wigan at Old Trafford.

He later signed a two-year deal with Championship club Toronto Wolfpack.

On 9 November 2020 it was announced that Russell would join Leigh for the 2021 season.
On 6 November 2021, it was reported that he had signed for Toulouse Olympique in the Super League
In round 1 of the 2022 Super League season, Russell scored Toulouse Olympique's first ever try in the competition, however it was not enough as they were defeated 42-14 by Huddersfield.

International career
Russell was named in the Scotland squad for the 2013 Rugby League World Cup. He was one of the star players in the tournament.

In 2016, Russell was part of Scotland's Four Nations campaign, where he scored a try in their second game against England. He also played in the historic game against New Zealand, where Scotland's 18-18 draw saw them become the first 'fourth nation' to earn a point since the Four Nations series inaugurated in 2009.

References

External links

Toronto Wolfpack profile
(archived by web.archive.org) Profile at warringtonwolves.com
Statistics at rugby-league.com

(archived by web.archive.org) Statistics at rugby-league.com
(archived by web.archive.org) Statistics at rlwc2017.com
Scotland profile
Scotland RL profile

1993 births
Living people
Hull F.C. players
Leigh Leopards players
Rugby league fullbacks
Rugby league players from Irvine, North Ayrshire
Scotland national rugby league team players
Scottish rugby league players
Swinton Lions players
Toronto Wolfpack players
Toulouse Olympique players
Warrington Wolves players
Wigan Warriors players